The Afghan cricket team toured Kenya from 2–11 October 2010. The tour consisted of one Intercontinental Cup Match and three One Day Internationals (ODIs).

Intercontinental Cup Match

ODI series

1st ODI

2nd ODI

3rd ODI

References

External links

2010 in Afghan cricket
2010 in Kenyan cricket
Afghan cricket tours of Kenya
International cricket competitions in 2010–11
Afghanistan 2010-11